Elijah Wasike Mwangale (January 1939 – 24 November 2004) was a Kenyan politician. He  was a minister for Agriculture, Minister of Foreign Affairs and a former member of parliament for the Kimilili Constituency. Attended West Virginia University in Morgantown, WV, USA.

References

1939 births
2004 deaths
Members of the National Assembly (Kenya)
Ministers of Agriculture of Kenya